Easton Cemetery is a historic rural cemetery located in Easton, Pennsylvania and the burial site of many notable individuals.

The cemetery was added to the National Register of Historic Places in 1990.

Easton Cemetery's parklike cemetery landscape design is based on the picturesque romantic styles of the early and late 19th century. Its landscape is set with thousands of examples of funeral artwork, in a variety of decorative styles, spanning Greco-Roman Revival, Gothic Victorian, and Art Deco. Established in 1849, Easton Cemetery is the earliest and best surviving example of a romantic parklike cemetery within the Lehigh Valley metro area. Architecturally noteworthy features include a Gothic Revival Gatehouse and office, stable, cemetery chapel, and a Gothic frame workshop. Its first president was prominent Easton citizen, Traill Green.

Notable burials
Fred Ashton (1931-2013), Mayor of Easton, Pennsylvania from 1968 to 1976
Joseph Davis Brodhead (1859-1920), Member of Congress, 1907 to 1909
Richard Brodhead (1811-1863), 19th century Pennsylvania state legislator
Charles F. Chidsey (1843-1933) first mayor of Easton (1887 to 1889) and member of the Pennsylvania House of Representatives (1896 to 1898)
Thomas Coates (1803-1895), "the Father of Band Music in America," and conductor, Regimental Band, Union Army's 47th Pennsylvania Infantry Regiment
Peter Ihrie Jr. (1796-1871), Member of Congress, 1829 to 1833
Philip Johnson (1818-1867), Member of Congress, 1863 to 1867
William Sebring Kirkpatrick (1844-1932), Member of Congress, 1897 to 1899
Howard Mutchler (1859-1916), Member of Congress, 1893 to 1895 and 1901 to 1903
William Mutchler (1831-1893), Member of Congress, 1875 to 1877, 1881 to 1885, and 1889 to 1893
James Madison Porter (1793-1862), U.S. Secretary of War, 1843 to 1844, and founder of Lafayette College
James F. Randolph (1791-1872), Member of Congress, 1828 to 1823
Joseph Fitz Randolph (1803-1873), Member of Congress, 1837 to 1843
Andrew Horatio Reeder (1807-1864), Kansas Territory governor, 1854 to 1855 
Jeanette Reibman (1915-2006), member of Pennsylvania House of Representatives, 1955 to 1966, and Pennsylvania State Senate, 1969 to 1994 and trustee, Lafayette College, 1970 to 1985
Samuel Sitgreaves (1764-1827), Member of Congress, 1797 to 1798
Henry Joseph Steele (1860-1933), Member of Congress, 1915 to 1921
George Taylor (1716-1781), founding father who signed the Declaration of Independence
David Douglas Wagener (1792-1860), Member of Congress (1833 to 1841)
Charles A. Wikoff  (1837-1898), Union Army officer in American Civil War later killed in action in Spanish–American War
C. Meyer Zulick (1838-1926), Arizona Territory governor, 1885 to 1889

Gallery

References

External links
Easton Cemetery at The Political Graveyard
Easton Cemetery at Find A Grave

Cemeteries established in the 1840s
Cemeteries on the National Register of Historic Places in Pennsylvania
Cemeteries in Pennsylvania
Buildings and structures in Northampton County, Pennsylvania
Easton, Pennsylvania
Historic districts on the National Register of Historic Places in Pennsylvania
National Register of Historic Places in Northampton County, Pennsylvania
Rural cemeteries